Platberg Stadium is a multi-use stadium situated in Harrismith, Free State, South Africa. It is currently used mostly for football matches and is the home ground of Maluti Fet College. It is accessed via Greyling Street.

Sports venues in the Free State (province)
Soccer venues in South Africa